Ian Edward Sansom (born 3 December 1966 in Essex, England) is the author of the Mobile Library Mystery Series. As of 2016, he has written four books in a series that will comprise a projected forty-four novels.

He is a frequent contributor to, and critic for, The Guardian and the London Review of Books.

He studied at both Oxford and Cambridge, where he was a fellow of Emmanuel College. He is a professor in the Department of English and Comparative Literary Studies at the University of Warwick and teaches in its Writing Program.

Personal life 
Ian Sansom is married and has three children. They reside in Bangor, County Down, Northern Ireland.

Bibliography
The Truth About Babies: From A-Z (2002)
Ring Road (2004) (US title - The Impartial Recorder)
The Case of the Missing Books (2006)
Mr Dixon Disappears (2006)
The Delegates' Choice (2007) (US title - The Book Stops Here)
The Enthusiast's Field Guide to Poetry (2007) (editor)
The Bad Book Affair (2009)
Paper: An Elegy (2012)
The Norfolk Mystery (1990)
Death in Devon (2015)
Westmorland Alone (2016)
Essex poison (2017) 
December Stories I (2018) No Alibis Press 
The Sussex Murder (2019) 
September 1, 1939: A Biography of a Poem (2019) 
Reading Room: A Year of Literary Curiosities (2019) 
December Stories 2 (2021)

References

External links

1966 births
Living people
English mystery writers
Fellows of Emmanuel College, Cambridge
Academics of Queen's University Belfast
Academics of the University of Warwick